Easwara Iyer was an  Indian politician who served as the Member of parliament, Lok Sabha for Trivandrum from 1957 to 1962. He was the first MP from Trivandrum since the formation of Kerala and was elected as an independent beating his closest rival A. Thanu Pillai of the Praja Socialist Party by a margin of 10,944 votes.

Notes 

India MPs 1957–1962
Lok Sabha members from Kerala